The following lists events that happened during 2014 in Finland.

Incumbents
 President: Sauli Niinistö
 Prime Minister: Jyrki Katainen (until 24 June), Alexander Stubb (starting 24 June)
 Speaker: Eero Heinäluoma

Events

June
 June 9 – Russian President Vladimir Putin's personal envoy warns Finland against joining NATO.
 June 13 – The city council of Pello offers 50 euro to each Finnish speaking taxpayer who changes language to Swedish in order to secure the bilingual Finnish-Swedish regime.
 June 24 – A new coalition government takes office in Finland, the first led by a Swedish-speaking Finn since 1959.

July
 July 24 – In Herat, Afghanistan, two Finnish women working for a foreign aid organization are shot and killed.
 July 25 – Vietnamese authorities confirm that a shipment of Vietnamese-owned air-to-air missile parts bound for Ukraine was detained by Finland on June 24 after raising concerns the consignment of military hardware violated arms-export regulations.

November
 November 28 – The Parliament of Finland votes to allow same-sex marriage, marking the first time that a citizens' initiative has received lawmakers' blessing to be written into the legislation.

References

External links
 

 
Years of the 21st century in Finland
Finland
2010s in Finland
Finland